Thomas Touré (born 27 December 1993) is an Ivorian professional footballer who plays as a winger for Belgian club Virton. He made one international appearance for the Ivory Coast national team in 2016.

Club career
Touré made his Ligue 1 debut on 4 May 2014 in a 0–1 away win against Valenciennes replacing Diego Rolán after 88 minutes in Stade du Hainaut.

In January 2019, he was loaned to Paris FC from Angers until the end of the season.

On 2 September 2021, he signed a two-year contract with Virton in Belgium.

International career
Touré was born in Grasse, France to an Ivorian father and a French mother. He made two appearances for France U18 in friendlies against the Swiss U18s.

He switched to the Ivory Coast national football team and made his debut in a 0–0 friendly tie with Hungary on 20 May 2016.

Career statistics

References

External links
 

1993 births
Sportspeople from Alpes-Maritimes
French sportspeople of Ivorian descent
People from Grasse
Living people
Association football wingers
Association football forwards
Ivorian footballers
Ivory Coast international footballers
French footballers
France youth international footballers
Ligue 1 players
Ligue 2 players
Championnat National 2 players
Championnat National 3 players
FC Girondins de Bordeaux players
Angers SCO players
Paris FC players
FC Sochaux-Montbéliard players
R.E. Virton players
Ivorian expatriate footballers
Expatriate footballers in Belgium
Ivorian expatriate sportspeople in Belgium
Footballers from Provence-Alpes-Côte d'Azur